Ian Nelson was a Scottish amateur football outside right who made one Scottish League Cup appearance for Queen's Park. He was capped by Scotland at amateur level.

References 

Scottish footballers
Scottish Football League players
Queen's Park F.C. players
Arbroath Victoria F.C. players
Association football outside forwards
Scotland amateur international footballers
Year of birth missing
Place of birth missing